Giuseppe Fatigati  (20 September 1906 – 9 September 1975) was an Italian film editor, producer and director.

Life and career 
Born in Terracina, Latina, Fatigati started his career as a film editor in the early 1930s,  and with this role he often collaborated to films directed by Mario Camerini, Gennaro Righelli and Guido Brignone. Besides serving as assistant director in several films he edited, Fatigati also had a limited activity as a film director, being better known for the musical comedy Voglio bene soltanto a te, starring Beniamino Gigli.  Starting from the second half of the 1940s he focused into producing, and he financed some films directed by Luigi Comencini, Riccardo Freda, Goffredo Alessandrini and Guido Brignone, among others. His last works were the productions of two films directed by Mario Imperoli and starring Gloria Guida, Monika and Blue Jeans.

Selected filmography
 Figaro and His Great Day (1931)
 The Devil's Lantern (1931)
 The Last Adventure (1932)
 The Wedding March (1934)
 Marcella (1937)
 They've Kidnapped a Man (1938)
 For Men Only (1938)
 The Castle Ball (1939)
 Kean (1940)
 Buried Alive (1949)

References

External links 
 

1906 births
1975 deaths
Italian film directors
20th-century Italian screenwriters
People from Terracina
Italian film editors
Italian film producers
Italian male screenwriters
20th-century Italian male writers